In its strictest sense, tmesis (plural tmeses ; Ancient Greek:  tmēsis  "a cutting" <  temnō, "I cut") is a word compound that is divided into two parts, with another word infixed between the parts, thus constituting a separate word compound. In a broader sense, tmesis is a recognizable phrase (such as a phrasal verb) or word that is divided into two parts, with one or more words interpolated between the parts, thus creating a separate phrase.

Verbs
Tmesis of prefixed verbs (whereby the prefix is separated from the simple verb) was an original feature of the Ancient Greek language, common in Homer (and later poetry), but not used in Attic prose.  Such separable verbs are also part of the normal grammatical usage of some modern languages, such as Dutch and German.

Ancient Greek
Tmesis in Ancient Greek is something of a misnomer, since there is not necessarily a splitting of the prefix from the verb; rather the consensus now seems to be that the separate prefix or pre-verb reflects a stage in the language where the prefix had not yet joined onto the verb. There are many examples in Homer's epics, the Iliad and the Odyssey, both of which preserve archaic features. In later Greek, these would combine to form the compound verb  kataleibōn "shedding (in a downwards direction)".

Latin
Tmesis is found as a poetic or rhetorical device in classical Latin poetry, such as Ovid's Metamorphoses. Words such as circumdare ("to surround") are split apart with other words of the sentence in between, e.g. circum virum dant: "they surround the man" (circumdant (circum- prefix + dant)). This device is used in this way to create a visual image of surrounding the man by means of the words on the line. In the work of the poet Ennius, the literal splitting of the word cerebrum creates a vivid image: saxo cere comminuit brum "he shattered his brain with a rock."

Old Irish
Tmesis can be found in some early Old Irish texts, such as Audacht Morainn. Old Irish verbs are found at the beginning of clauses (in a VSO word order) and often possess prepositional pre-verbal particles, e.g. ad-midethar (ad- prefix) "evaluates, estimates". Tmesis occurs when the pre-verbal particle is separated from the verbal stem and the verbal stem is placed in clause final position while the pre-verbal particle/prefix remains at the beginning of the clause. This results in an abnormal word order, e.g. ad- cruth caín -cichither "[the] fair form will be seen" (where ad-chichither is the future third-person singular passive of ad-cí "sees").

Old Norse
Examples of tmesis have been found in skaldic poetry. In addition to the use of kennings, skalds used tmesis to obscure the meaning of the poem. One use of tmesis was to divide the elements of personal names.

German
The so-called separable verbs have a separable particle that changes the meaning of the root verb, but that does not always remain attached to the root verb. German sentence structure normally places verbs in second position or final position. For separable verbs, the particle always appears in final position. If a particular sentence's structure places the entire verb in final position, then the particle and root verb appear together. If a sentence places the verb in second position, then only the root verb will appear in second position; the separated particle remains at the end of the sentence. For example, the separable verb anfangen ("to start") consists of the separable particle an and the root fangen:

Root verb in second position: Ich fange die Arbeit an. ("I start the work.")
Root verb in final position: Morgens trinke ich heiße Schokolade, weil ich dann die Arbeit anfange. ("In the morning I drink hot chocolate, because afterwards I begin the work.")

However, in many other German verbs the particle (such as be- or ent-) is inseparable, always staying with the root verb.

In some verbs, the past participle prefix ge is inserted in the middle of the word, for instance:

Ich habe die Arbeit bereits angefangen. ("I have already begun the assignment.")

English
Colloquial examples include un-bloody-believable and several variants. Numerous English words are joined with the vulgar infix -fucking-, such as "unfuckingbelievable". The phrase A whole nother...(story / kettle of fish / ball game / etc.), wherein whole is interpolated within the word another, is an example of tmesis that results in a noun phrase rather than a compound word.

English employs a large number of phrasal verbs, consisting of a core verb and a particle. A phrasal verb is written as two words that are analyzed semantically as a unit, but the unit may be separable under certain circumstances. For example, regarding a phrasal verb that has a transitive sense: 
Turn off the light  OR  Turn the light off. (optional tmesis)
Hand in the application OR Hand it in. (optional tmesis)

Similarly, tmesis can occur regarding a phrasal verb that has an intransitive sense. For example:
Come back tomorrow OR Come on back tomorrow. (adjunctive tmesis)
Let's head out OR Let's head right out. (adjunctive tmesis)

The intervention of an adverb or transitive object in the middle of the phrasal verb can be viewed as a form of tmesis even though the semantic unit being separated is written as two words even when not separated.

See also
 Interfix
 Affix
 Clitic
 Diacope
 Expletive infixation
 Lexical diffusion
  on future verbs
 Separable verb
 Split infinitive

References

Rhetoric
Figures of speech
Poetic devices
Word order
Infixes